Ballindalloch railway station served the village of Ballindalloch, Banffshire, Scotland from 1863 to 1965 on the Strathspey Railway.

History 
The station opened on 1 July 1863 by the Great North of Scotland Railway. To the north was Cragganmore distillery, which had opened because it was close to the railway. There were two goods sheds: a two-storey goods shed that connected with the distillery and the other was in the middle of the large goods yard which was to the east. The two-storey goods shed was used to store whisky from the distillery. The station closed to both passengers and goods traffic on 18 October 1965.

References

External links 

Disused railway stations in Moray
Railway stations in Great Britain opened in 1863
Railway stations in Great Britain closed in 1965
Beeching closures in Scotland
1863 establishments in Scotland
1965 disestablishments in Scotland
Former Great North of Scotland Railway stations